Nõmmküla may refer to several places in Estonia:

Nõmmküla, Lääne-Viru County, village in Väike-Maarja Parish, Lääne-Viru County
Nõmmküla, Rapla County, village in Raikküla Parish, Rapla County
Nõmmküla, Tapa Parish, village in Tapa Parish, Lääne-Viru County
Nõmmküla, Saare County, village in Muhu Parish, Saare County

See also
Suur-Nõmmküla
Väike-Nõmmküla